Bulgwang Station is a subway station located in Eunpyeong-gu, which is a district in Seoul, South Korea. This station is on the Seoul Subway Line 3 and Line 6.

The station is located on the one-way Eungam Loop of Line 6, and therefore the trains from the Line 6 Bulgwang station only run in the direction of Dokbawi Station.

Station layout

Station Peripheral Information 
There are NC Department Store Bulgwang Branch, and CGV Bulgwang is located. Right across the street is Daejo Market.

References 

Metro stations in Eunpyeong District
Seoul Metropolitan Subway stations
Railway stations in South Korea opened in 1985
Seoul Subway Line 3
Seoul Subway Line 6